Eric McGraw (born Derek Campbell, 3 February 1945 – 18 April 2021) was a British publisher and prison reform activist who founded the prisoner's newspaper Inside Time in 1990.

References

1945 births
2021 deaths
British newspaper publishers (people)
Prison reformers